RK Izviđač (English: Handball Club Izviđač) is a team handball club from Ljubuški, Bosnia and Herzegovina, RK Izviđač competes in the Handball Championship of Bosnia and Herzegovina, with eight titles won it is the most successful team in the country.

Kits

Honours
Handball Championship of Bosnia and Herzegovina (record)
  Winners (8): 2000, 2002, 2004, 2005, 2016, 2018, 2019, 2021
Handball Cup of Bosnia and Herzegovina:
  Winners (3): 1999, 2002, 2022
Herzeg-Bosnia Championship:
  Winners (7): 1995, 1996, 1997, 1998, 1999, 2000, 2001
Cup of Herzeg-Bosnia:
  Winners (8): 1994, 1995, 1996, 1997, 1998, 1999, 2000, 2001

Team

Staff
Staff for the 2020–21 season

Current squad
Squad for the 2020–21 season

Goalkeepers
 1 Ivan Herceg
 16 Ante Grbavac
 25 Matej Mandić

Left Wingers
 13 Mirko Mišetić
 15 Ivan Miličević
 20 Petar Medić

Right Wingers
 11 Mladen Bošković
 14 Luka Bubalo

Line players
 10 Fran Pavlović
 19 Dragan Šoljić
 23 Amir Muhović

Left Backs
 4 Domagoj Alilović
 5 Miloš Kos
 8 Nikola Primorac
 9 Stipe Pavlović
 18 Diano Ćeško
 22 Mihael Bebek 

Central Backs 
 2 Milan Vukšić
 17 Ivano Pavlović

Right Backs
 6 Filip Odak
 7 Stjepan Jozinović

Recent seasons

The recent season-by-season performance of the club:

Notable players

Ivan Karačić
Nikola Prce 
Darko Martinović
Mirko Alilović
Marin Šego
Adnan Harmandić
Vlado Šola 
Mirko Herceg
Ljubo Vukić
Željko Musa
Dejan Malinović
Marko Matić
Ivan Milas
Senjamin Burić 
Benjamin Burić 
Denis Buntić
Marin Vegar
Josip Perić 
Matej Hrstić
David Mandić
Igor Radojević
Mirsad Terzić

Coaching history

Boris Jarak 
Josip Glavaš
Zdenko Grbavac
Miro Markić
Dario Mikulić
Silvio Ivandija
Saša Kuček
Vladimir Aleksejevič Petrov
Ilija Puljević
Mladen Škorput
Mirko Novković
Silvio Ivandija

References

External links 
HRK Izviđač

Sport in Ljubuški
Bosnia and Herzegovina handball clubs
Handball clubs established in 1956
1956 establishments in Bosnia and Herzegovina